Fred Daniels (January 27, 1893 - February 27, 1993) was a Negro leagues pitcher for several years before the founding of the first Negro National League, and in its first few seasons.  He pitched for the Dallas Black Giants, the St. Louis Giants, the Birmingham Black Barons, and the Lincoln Giants.

In 1993, Daniels died at the age of 100. He is buried at Augusta Memorial Park in Waynesboro, Virginia.

References

External links
 and Baseball-Reference Black Baseball stats and Seamheads

Birmingham Black Barons players
Lincoln Giants players
St. Louis Giants players
1893 births
1993 deaths
Baseball players from Texas
American centenarians
Men centenarians
20th-century African-American sportspeople